Qom Tappeh may refer to:
 Qom Tappeh, Maragheh
 Qom Tappeh, Shabestar